Wenona is an unincorporated community located on Deal Island in Somerset County, Maryland, United States. It is located at the western end of Maryland Route 363, Deal Island Road.

The Clarence Crockett, F. C. Lewis, Jr, Fannie L. Daugherty, Howard, Susan May and Thomas W. Clyde are listed on the National Register of Historic Places.

References

Unincorporated communities in Somerset County, Maryland
Unincorporated communities in Maryland
Maryland populated places on the Chesapeake Bay